Popov is a rural locality (a khutor) in Ostrovskoye Rural Settlement, Danilovsky District, Volgograd Oblast, Russia. The population was 113 as of 2010. There are 2 streets.

Geography 
Popov is located in forest steppe, on the Lomovka River, 41 km northwest of Danilovka (the district's administrative centre) by road. Nizhniye Korobki is the nearest rural locality.

References 

Rural localities in Danilovsky District, Volgograd Oblast